Maurice Le Noblet Duplessis  (April 20, 1890 – September 7, 1959), byname "Le Chef" ("The Boss"), was a Canadian lawyer and politician who served as the 16th premier of Quebec. A conservative, nationalist, populist, anti-Communist, anti-unionist and fervent Catholic, Duplessis and his party, the Union Nationale, dominated provincial politics from the 1930s to the 1950s. He is the longest-serving premier of Quebec since Confederation by cumulative time of service, having led the province for 18 years.

Son of Nérée Duplessis, a lawyer who served as a Conservative member of the Legislative Assembly (MLA), Maurice studied law in Montreal and became a member of the Bar of Quebec in 1913. He then returned to his home town of Trois-Rivières to practice law, where he founded a successful consultancy. Duplessis narrowly lost the campaign for the Trois-Rivières seat in the 1923 election, but managed to get elected in 1927 as a Conservative MLA. His rhetorical skills helped him become the leader of the Official Opposition in the Legislative Assembly in 1933 in the place of Camillien Houde. As opposition leader, he agreed to a coalition with Paul Gouin's Action libérale nationale (ALN), which they called the Union Nationale. It lost in 1935 but gained a majority the following year as Gouin retired from politics and Duplessis took over the leadership, thus breaking almost 40 years of uninterrupted rule by the Quebec Liberal Party. Le Chef, in addition to his premiership duties, assigned himself the role of Attorney General and briefly held other ministerial posts as well.

The first three years in government were difficult for Duplessis as the government struggled to respond to the ongoing hardships of the Great Depression. That term saw the introduction of several key welfare policies (such as the universal minimum wage and old-age pensions), but the effort to strengthen his rule by calling a snap election in 1939 failed as his campaigning on the issue of World War II backfired and his government left the economy in a poor state. However, the Conscription Crisis of 1944 propelled him back to power in that year's election, which Le Chef would exercise until his death. As was the general trend of the time, he presided over a period of robust economic growth due to the rising demand in resources, which the province used to develop Côte-Nord and rural areas. Duplessis was a strong proponent of economic liberalism and implemented pro-business policies by keeping taxes low, refraining from regulation and adopting pro-employer labour policies, in particular by cracking down on trade unions. Le Chef usually met the federal government's initiatives with strong resistance due to his convictions on provincial autonomy. In the social domain, Duplessis maintained and protected the traditional role of the Catholic Church in Quebec's society, notably in healthcare and education, and was ruthless to the perceived enemies to the church or to the Catholic nature of the province, such as Jehovah's Witnesses and communists.

Duplessis's legacy remains controversial more than 60 years after his death. Compared to the Anglophones, the French Canadians remained worse off in the province where they constituted a majority just as his government was courting Anglophone and out-of-province businessmen to invest. This clientelist relationship with the business spheres often morphed into outright corruption. Le Chef's authoritarian tendencies, his all-powerful electoral machine, staunch conservatism, a cozy relationship with the Catholic Church, the mistreatment of Duplessis Orphans and the apparent backwardness of his model of development were also subject of criticism. Thus his critics labelled the period the Grande Noirceur (Great Darkness), which stuck in Quebec's society in a large degree thanks to the efforts of those who led the Quiet Revolution in the 1960s. This was also the initial general opinion of historians and intellectuals, but since the 1990s, academics have revisited Duplessism and concluded that this assessment required nuancing and placement in the contemporary perspective and, in some cases, advocated outright rejection of that label.

Biography

Early life

Family 

Maurice Le Noblet Duplessis was born on April 20, 1890, in Trois-Rivières to a religious family that was quite wealthy. He was the second child and only son of Nérée Le Noblet Duplessis, a member of the Legislative Assembly of Quebec (MLA) for Saint-Maurice. Maurice's father, who came from a family of peasants residing in nearby Yamachiche, was a kind but busy man and spent little time with the family, which was, however, expected at the time. Two of Nérée's sisters married politicians who would also sit in the Legislative Assembly. Maurice's mother was Berthe Genest, who had Scottish and Irish origins on her maternal side. The family of the future premier was well-disposed to Anglophones; Duplessis would even joke that he was "one of them".

At the end of the 19th century, the Duplessis family of Trois-Rivières was active in the political and religious life of the region, and the members of the family could often be found among conservative and ultramontanist sympathizers, with whom they would often debate current political events. Some of the influential figures of the time, including Louis-Olivier Taillon, Edmund James Flynn, Joseph-Mathias Tellier, Louis-Philippe Pelletier and Thomas Chapais, could be found there. In addition to that, Maurice's father, a deeply pious person, maintained close relations with Louis-François Richer Laflèche, the bishop of the Diocese of Trois-Rivières, where he worked as legal counsel. The bishop supported his electoral bid for the Saint-Maurice seat in 1886, which Nérée won. Maurice was born during his father's reelection campaign, who chose to name his son for the electoral district he was the MLA for. The newborn boy was then baptized by Laflèche himself.

Studies 
In 1898, Duplessis left his home city to study at the Collège Notre-Dame in Montreal, which was run by the Congregation of Holy Cross. There he met André Bessette (better known as Brother André), then porter of the college, who came to like young Duplessis and handed him over the task of finding students whom the rector wished to see. The relationship was so close that it was then that Duplessis developed the cult of Saint Joseph, which he carried for the rest of his life, and which sometimes influenced his political choices. The future premier was a bright student, excelling in French, history, Latin and philosophy; at the same time, he was known to be playful and sometimes mischievous (a "scamp", as Conrad Black suggests) which would often lead Duplessis into trouble.

In 1902, Duplessis moved to the Séminaire de Trois-Rivières in order to pursue his study in a classical college. Maurice continued to excel in other subjects, including history, theology, Latin and Greek, which helped him become the best student in his year, but in particular sharpened his rhetorical skills while attending the debate club at the college's Saint Thomas Aquinas Society. Maurice would, as Conrad Black wrote, "enjoy, almost wallow in, extravagant but thin treatises on the founders of French Canada", where he would show his attachment to and admiration of his roots and the Catholic faith. He was especially fond of Louis Hébert, one of the first colonizers of the New France and a pioneer of farming in the area, which Black suggests was a sign that he already had a deep affection for the rural lifestyle at this stage, particularly given that he spent the summer with his grandfather in Yamachiche.

Duplessis's interest for politics appeared at a very young age. As early as at the age of ten, Maurice expressed strong interest in the electoral statistics of Quebec, and later in his adolescence, he was already engaging in political meetings and was speaking with the voters. The future premier was preparing for public life by working in a political organisation of Joseph-Arthur Barrette, a Conservative MP for Berthier, though when it came to politics, Duplessis preferred its practical aspects, rather than the theory.

When finishing school, Maurice Duplessis felt attracted to public life, while at the same time, he was equally devoted to the Catholic Church due to the influence of Brother André. However, Maurice felt that being a religious minister bore too many constraints, and, later in his life, he confided to his secretary that "the sacerdocy [was] too much for me." He was not interested to pursue a business career, either, because, as Black suggested, "he knew the English had an overwhelming advantage". Strongly influenced by the family and by the uptick in engagement in political matters, he decided to go in his father's footsteps. Thus in autumn of 1910, he enrolled in the faculty of law at the Université Laval in Montreal, which is now a separate university called Université de Montréal. Pursuing a law degree was then a standard way to get into politics. According to Conrad Black, Duplessis's pastimes of the time were not numerous:

While studying, he was noted for his liveliness, sharp responses and socializing. Duplessis, sitting in the opposition, was a local star within the model parliament organized by the university. The future premier of Quebec, before practising law, trained in the offices of Rodolphe Monty et Alfred Duranleau, two nationalist conservatives and friends of Duplessis's family, where Maurice was referred to by his father, Nérée.

Entry into politics

Law practice 

After three years of studies, Duplessis was admitted to the Bar of Quebec on September 4 or 14, 1913. He first worked for a short time together with his father, before Nérée Duplessis was nominated as judge of the Superior Court of Quebec on June 15, 1914. The future Premier then opened his own consultancy, Duplessis, Langlois & Lamothe, Avocats et Procureurs, on Hart Street, behind his parents' house, together with Édouard Langlois, an old friend of his from the Séminaire who became husband of Duplessis's sister, Gabrielle, and another lawyer from Trois-Rivières, Léon Lamothe. The partnership of these lawyers lasted at least until the early 1930s. Duplessis did not serve in the Canadian Armed Forces during World War I as he was exempt from conscription.

Practising civil law more than criminal law, Duplessis developed his large client base among the ordinary people, who were attracted due to his arguments in court that often proved persuasive. He was quickly recognized as a sociable and competent lawyer who approached his cases carefully, and thus became a popular figure in the town. The young lawyer engaged in the activities of his area, notably directing of a local baseball team, and became a fixture in high-end taverns of his town. His professional success, briefly interrupted by the death of his mother in 1921, let him buy a personal Winton on a loan (to great dismay of his father). Duplessis suspended his law career in early 1934 amid mounting obligations in the Legislative Assembly, though he would still be formally mentioned as a member of the bar.

First electoral successes 

Despite a promising career start in his legal profession, Duplessis did not lose sight from his political ambitions. He made his first attempt to get to the Legislative Assembly of Quebec in 1923, when he became a Conservative candidate for the riding of Trois-Rivières, seeking to oust the incumbent Liberal , Louis-Philippe Mercier. The campaign was a heated one. Mercier benefited from a well-organized political structure in the area, directed by his mentor, Jacques Bureau, who at the time served as a member of Parliament for Three Rivers and St. Maurice and the federal minister of customs and excise. Maurice counted on the solidarity of his fellow lawyers, the good reputation among his clients as well as his father's acquaintances' support (notably Louis-Olivier Taillon), some of whom came over to make speeches in Duplessis's favour. His campaign focused on the criticism of what Duplessis alleged was Premier Louis-Alexandre Taschereau's "contempt towards provincial autonomy" and towards municipal rights, while also speaking against the Liberals' management of the judiciary. Despite a rather close race, Maurice lost to the incumbent, with 1,328 votes for Duplessis and 1,612 for Mercier. Duplessis at the time did not expect to win the riding anyway, but instead hoped that his good showing would make him a good candidate of the opposition leader in the region.

Duplessis attempted a second run to the Legislative Assembly, trying to get as much support from working- and middle-class families as he could, including by paying personal visits to them and tracking his opponent's moves during Mercier's another four years in office; his resolve to get to the provincial parliament increased even further after his father died in 1926. Despite a dismal showing of the Conservatives in the 1927 election, where they only managed to capture 9 out of 85 seats, Duplessis eked out a victory of 2,622 to 2,496 votes in a rematch against Mercier and flipped the Trois-Rivières seat, previously considered a Liberal stronghold, for the first time in 27 years. In his victory speech, he is said to have declared that "There stands before you a future Prime Minister of Quebec".

At the time when Duplessis was elected, the Legislative Assembly was only in session for two months in a year, which allowed Duplessis to spend more time in his electoral district. Duplessis became immediately active on the parliament floor once the session started on January 10, 1928. In his maiden speech on January 19, the Legislative Assembly freshman decried the overemphasis on industrial development, as opposed to rural and small-business interests, called to stop increasing taxes and to respect the religious nature of Sundays, and proposed to make an inventory of the forest industry (it was suspected at the time that the resources were being overexploited) and to reorganize the provincial police. The first speech left Premier Taschereau impressed, who reportedly remarked that "this young man [...] will go far". His rhetorical skills and the knowledge of the law on the books made him a rising star in the opposition. When Arthur Sauvé left the leadership of the Conservatives, it was even supposed that Duplessis could take the steers of the battered party, but at the time, Duplessis was not ready yet. Camillien Houde, Mayor of Montreal, was nominated instead, but he often had to leave the parliament sessions because of his other demanding job, so Duplessis, whom the Conservative caucus already saw as a safe alternative to Houde should his policies fail, was able to informally lead the caucus in the leader's absence.

Arthur Sauvé, in his resignation speech, asked his successor "to reestablish order in our ravaged ranks". Even though the new leader liked Duplessis, the future premier did not particularly trust Houde's organizational capabilities, finding him "a verbose, blustering, impetuous man". He also said to his party colleague, Antonio Barrette, who would serve briefly as Premier in 1960: "You’re going to see Houde get to the top of the mountain and then be over the hill". Conrad Black characterized his relationship with Houde, together with his political views, in the following way:

Later events seemed to confirm Duplessis's intuition. In the 1931 election, the Conservatives were again resoundingly defeated, with only 11 seats out of 90 in the party's hands despite the fact that the Conservatives got a markedly larger share of votes provincially. Houde lost his own riding, while Duplessis got barely reelected with a razor-thin margin of 41 votes (3,812 for Duplessis versus 3,771 for Louis-Philippe Bigué, his Liberal challenger). Upon learning the results, Taschereau declared that "this outcome means the end of Houdism".

Rise to power

Leader of the Official Opposition 
The 1931 election has seen the Conservatives internal strife, already present in Sauvé years, intensify. The party members could not even agree to a common strategy of dealing with the results of the election. Houde opted for a recount in 63 ridings won by Liberals, alleging widespread electoral fraud; Duplessis, however, was among a group of dissident MLAs who refused to endorse Houde's idea, with Duplessis particularly being afraid that his narrow victory would be overturned. The plan was frustrated by the governing Liberals, who passed legislation requiring that Can$1,000 be paid for each contested riding. In an effort to appease the Anglophone community, Houde designated an ageing Charles Ernest Gault, a Houde ally and long-time MLA from Montréal–Saint-Georges, as a new leader of the parliamentary caucus. The choice enraged Duplessis, who was a rising star in his party. Houde also nominated Gault as leader of the Conservatives after he lost his mayorship and resigned from the leadership of the party on 19 September 1932, but the Conservative caucus overrode that decision on November 7 and put Duplessis in charge.

The decision was formally confirmed during a party congress in Sherbrooke on October 4–5, 1933, when Duplessis was confirmed in his position, getting 332 votes against 214 cast for Onésime Gagnon, an MLA from Dorchester who favoured closer ties with the federal Conservatives. Duplessis received support from seven out of 10 MLAs from his party as well as all federal ministers from Quebec with the exception of Maurice Dupré, who was a law partner of Gagnon. While Duplessis got less support from the Anglophones due to him being perceived as too nationalist, Richard Jones argues that it was the superior organisation and not the nationalist rhetoric that secured Maurice's victory. Despite the victory, the tensions within the Conservative caucus did not subside.

The news of the election of the new leader was received well in Trois-Rivières and Quebec City. Duplessis met with Cardinal Jean-Marie-Rodrigue Villeneuve, Anglican bishop Williams, Henry George Carroll, the Lieutenant Governor of Quebec, as well as the mayor of Quebec City, Henri-Edgar Lavigueur. On the other hand, Camillien Houde was angered by the choice of his party's caucus. He bitterly declared that "either I will perish or they [Duplessis supporters] will" and said that he was "free to associate myself with any serious movement that will try to get us rid of two political parties in Quebec that perpetuate the idea that the power trumps the law". Houde would only reconcile with Duplessis in 1944.

Duplessis immediately engaged in his new job. In his response to Taschereau's speech from the throne, Duplessis harshly criticized the management of the province, in particular pointing to the overcapitalization of companies, chaos in the province's industry and resource exploitation, and what he saw as unjust treatment of the municipalities, unnecessary confrontations with the federal government, the lack of respect for traditions and pandering too much to big business interests instead of developing rural areas. Unlike some of his other colleagues in the party centered around Aimé Guertin, however, he opposed trust-busting in order to increase the clout of French-Canadian businesses and saw unfavourably the advocacy of some of his party colleagues to overhaul the social welfare system.

Despite the differences within the opposition, the governing Liberals had even more problems. Quebec was in the midst of the Great Depression, which left Canada's economy declining. The Liberal Party, then in power for more than 35 years, was suffering from internal tensions, too, but also from the laissez-faire economic policies that proved inadequate for the crisis, and what Conrad Black described as inflexibility and population's weariness of the government that has been in power for too long. As a result, some of the Liberal MLAs became disillusioned with Taschereau and created a new party, the Action libérale nationale (ALN).

Coalition with the Action libérale nationale 

The new party, which in particular despised the big business's interests in the province, consisted of nationalist and progressive MLAs led by Paul Gouin and included some other figures, such as Philippe Hamel, Joseph-Ernest Grégoire and Oscar Drouin. The members of the new political force drew heavily from the Programme de restauration sociale, a social policy document drafted by the Catholic clergy in 1933 that advocated corporatism as an alternative for capitalism and communism and sought to improve the position of French Canadians in the province by expanding the social welfare net, breaking (and, if needed, nationalizing) trusts and revitalizing rural areas. In particular, the party was critical of the energy trusts and sought to bring the hydroelectricity companies under state control. The New Deal policies adopted south of the Canadian border had also some impact on ALN's ideology.

Initially, Maurice Duplessis was skeptical of the third political force, saying that "two [parties] are enough: one good and one bad". He was then preparing for the upcoming 1935 election, starting a tour across the province more than a year before the voters were to go to the ballots. On 17 June 1934, Duplessis visited the Antonio Élie, a fellow deputy from Yamaska and an award-winning breeder of foxes, where he delivered a speech underlining his attachment to the traditions and distrust of the modern and urban life. He also attacked the presence of foreign economic interests in the province, accusing Taschereau of supporting supermarkets with tax credits while leaving independent shop owners vulnerable to bankruptcy and by leaving the extraction of natural resources in the hands of foreign capital, which he argued let them be used against Quebeckers. These arguments echoed those made by the ALN, whose strength was amplified by Duplessis's incessant attacks on the government, even if Duplessis tried to assure that "honest" capital would remain untouched in the province and that they were less extreme than the maverick Liberals.

Maurice remained distrustful of the ALN members, seeing them as unreliable men who would join the Liberals after the election and ruin his dream of heading the government himself, and warned his fellow party colleagues to stay away from ALN advances, even when publicly he encouraged "all sincere Liberals" to join forces. Despite Oscar Drouin's call to Duplessis to unite in their quest to overturn the Taschereau government, the federal Conservatives' crushing defeat in the 1935 federal election in October, a prospect of three-headed race in the first-past-the-post system that would cause vote splitting issues, and finally, Taschereau's decision to call a snap election on November 25, 1935, in a bid to capitalize on an electoral success of the federal Liberals in Quebec, Duplessis remained opposed to any agreement with the breakaway Liberals. However, faced with overwhelming support of a coalition within his party and donors' and organizers' threats to withhold resources if the Conservatives did not sign a coalition agreement, Duplessis was forced to sign one on November 7, 1935. According to the agreement, a so-called Union Nationale coalition was formed; each riding had only one candidate from the opposition, but two-thirds of ridings were signed off to the ALN members and all opposition candidates ran on ALN's platform, which was declared to be identical to the Conservatives'; if the Union Nationale won, Duplessis, given his experience, would become Premier but Gouin would choose the majority of his cabinet.

The coalition failed to displace the Liberals from power, who got elected in 48 out of 90 ridings, just enough for the majority but 31 fewer than in 1931 and 20 fewer than just before the election. As for the opposition, the Conservatives managed to win 16 ridings, the best result since 1923, while the ALN got 26 MLAs. Duplessis got reelected with a safe margin of 1,202 out of 8,544 votes in total. The charisma and ardour of Duplessis, in contrast to the temperate behaviour of Paul Gouin, would strongly influence the MLAs from the Action libérale nationale, and a lot of them would co-create the new merged party of the same name as the coalition.

Ascendancy of the Union Nationale 

Maurice Duplessis continued his offensive when the new parliamentary session opened. In spring 1936, Duplessis managed to call the parliamentary public accounts committee to start an inquiry into the management of public funds by the Taschereau government, in which Duplessis would place himself as prosecutor. Numerous irregularities were uncovered, where various Liberal government officials acknowledged having used the public money inappropriately. For example, Antoine Taschereau, premier's brother and accountant of the Quebec Legislature, was forced to resign when he admitted having pocketed interest from the government's bank deposits. Duplessis even capitalized on the seemingly trivial infractions, such as when Irénée Vautrin, confessed that he had bought trousers on his ministry's money, only to promptly denounce this as a symbol of the corruption of the Taschereau government. The fact that the newspapers reported on all the smallest details of the inquiry made the committee job a political goldmine for Duplessis. As a result of such revelations, Taschereau resigned on June 11, 1936, and handed over the premiership to Adélard Godbout, who was forced to call an election on August 17 that year.

The political situation during that year changed dramatically. Even though Duplessis entered the election as a junior coalition partner, his charisma, rhetorical skills and his grilling of the Liberal officials has earned him support from most of ALN deputies; Gouin, on the other hand, proved not to be a good leader of the opposition and even handed over most of coalition matters to Duplessis because of the latter's expertise in politics. On the organizational level, the Conservatives succeeded in capturing the Union Nationale brand for them. Moreover, the corruption inquiry severely weakened the governing party, which gave Duplessis a chance to single-handedly win the premiership. Therefore, on 17 June, Duplessis announced his refusal to renew the coalition agreement even though the election writs were already issued. The leader of the Conservatives was quickly able to force an increase of the proportion of Conservative ridings in the coalition from one-third to two-thirds, but the next day, Gouin decided to break with Duplessis and started campaigning independently against the other two parties. Gouin's bid attracted little support, as 35 out of 42 Union Nationale coalition MLAs who came to a caucus meeting in Sherbrooke backed Duplessis's takeover of the coalition, and most of ALN's members joined Duplessis and the newly created Union Nationale party. Eventually, Gouin said he would not field any candidates in any ridings due to his "temporary" retirement from politics, which confirmed Duplessis's leadership.

The Union Nationale made an electoral campaign along similar lines to the 1935 election, formalizing that in a pamphlet called Le Catéchisme des électeurs, designed in a question-and-answer format to address the contemporary political and economical issues, while also adding attacks on corruption. Duplessis successfully tied Godbout to the deeply unpopular Taschereau and rallied massive support for his political appearances. When the voters came to the polls, they delivered a landslide victory for the Duplessis's party, handing 76 out of 90 seats and ending the Liberal rule over Quebec that lasted for 39 years.

First term (1936–1939) 

Duplessis immediately embarked on fulfilling some of the electoral promises. Among the programs that are credited with the longevity of the Union Nationale is the creation of the Farm Credit Bureau, which sent low-interest loans to rural areas and which proved popular with what would be the electoral base of his party. However, Duplessis emphatically refused to nationalize the producers of electricity and largely continued the economical policies of his predecessor. This provoked an exodus of former ALN members from the Union Nationale's caucus but it did not threaten Duplessis's majority.

Duplessis first rose to the highest office in the province in a difficult time, as the Great Depression ravaged through the province, leaving hundreds of thousands of people unemployed. The expenditures on these social programs and lack of growth in the 1930s caused a severe budgetary crisis, as debt nearly doubled within his three years in office. The federal government started intervening in the province's finances to stabilize them, but Duplessis resisted these attempts as he thought they violated the principle of the provincial autonomy.

The Quebec government started handing out old-age pensions and approved workplace accident protections in its first year in office. Public works projects, such as the completion of the Montreal Botanical Garden, were also initiated. It was during this term that the first legislation in the history of Quebec recognizing the right to a minimum salary ("fair wage" as it was called back then) was extended to everyone, though this law saw several problems in its implementation due to lack of uniformity and reluctance of trade unions to embrace it. In line with the Church's teaching, Duplessis launched a program of assistance to needy mothers (but not to unwed, divorced or separated women), as well as to the blind and the orphaned. This cabinet saw the first Ministry of Health in Quebec, and it also financed the new , a research facility similar to Paris's Pasteur Institute.

The themes that unite both the pre-war and the post-war administration was the anti-unionism and anti-communism. Among the most known laws of the time is the Padlock Law, which granted Duplessis, in his capacity as Attorney General, the right to prosecute those arranging for, distributing or promoting Communist materials and propaganda and lock down their properties, but due to the law's vagueness, it could be used against anyone considered an enemy of the administration. Trade unions were among the victims of the law's arbitrary application, but they had other problems as well. Another law Duplessis's government to unilaterally amend any contract between the trade union and the employer, and yet another regulation banned closed shops and union shops.

On 1 September 1939, Germany invaded Poland in what is commonly recognized as the beginning of World War II. Duplessis decided to seize that opportunity and announced a snap election to cement his grip on power by rallying the population around the fears of conscription (which French Canadians overwhelmingly opposed in World War I), but his gamble failed as the Liberals, whom he accused of wanting to send French Canadians to the frontline, declared their opposition to the plan. The Union Nationale, seen as unable to implement a coherent set of policies, received only 15 out of 86 votes in the election of 1939.

Return to the Official Opposition 

The defeat of the Union Nationale met Duplessis's leadership in danger. Some of his fellow MLAs were mad at his starting the election in an unfortunate moment. Joseph-Damase Bégin called to convene a caucus meeting to consider changing the leader, with Onésime Gagnon and Hormisdas Langlais as possible contenders. Duplessis, however, managed to persuade his colleagues not to do that. The Union Nationale was at the brink of implosion but eventually survived the turbulent period following the 1939 electoral defeat. Another challenge to his leadership came in 1942, when Duplessis was criticised for his alcoholic tendencies—he would sometimes participate in parliamentary deliberations while completely drunk—but after being absent for a few months due to surgical treatment of strangulated hernia (see relevant section), the leader of opposition decided to quit drinking altogether.

The Liberals introduced some progressive policies during their five years in power. One of the main achievements of the Godbout administration was granting women suffrage in provincial elections (they were allowed to vote in federal elections since 1917). Duplessis had previously considered the issue several times, but largely avoided discussing it and generally either submitted abstentions or nays during floor votes, and at one time proposed to block the legislation in committee. On this vote, Duplessis, as most of Union Nationale members, opposed the government, with the leader of the opposition in particular citing Godbout's voting record on women's suffrage (he voted "nay" on seven previous occasions) and criticizing the about-face, while also airing concerns about an increase in government expenditures and electoral fraud that he connected to women's suffrage. Duplessis did make some efforts to prevent passage of the bill but ultimately he did not seem to as intrigued by the issue as some other MLAs.

Another landmark policy of the Liberals, the introduction of compulsory schooling from age six to fourteen in 1943, was prompted by a report noting high dropout rates after four years of formal schooling. As with the women's suffrage, the bill was opposed by Union Nationale and Duplessis (only Camille Pouliot voted with the Liberals), and during his fifteen years in power after Godbout, the obligation was very rarely followed in Quebec. Finally, in 1944, Godbout created Hydro-Québec from the nationalization of Montreal Light, Heat & Power and its subsidiary Beauharnois Power, but Duplessis again opposed the policy, saying that its timing just before the 1944 election suggested that it was a political campaign trick. He also disagreed with the details of its implementation (he argued that the takeover should have been made by Montreal rather than the provincial government), the fact that the nationalization would cost taxpayer money and that the high electricity prices (the main driver of the nationalization) could be lowered via negotiations between the government and the companies, rather than by assuming state ownership.

1944 election 
It was mostly due to their efforts as part of the Ligue pour la Défense du Canada, the precursor to the Bloc populaire, that over 72% of Quebeckers voted against introducing conscription in 1942, in stark contrast with English-speaking Canada, which overwhelmingly voted in favour. A nationalist formation, it supported the nationalization of hydroelectricity and argued for more autonomy for Quebec; at the same time it drew inspirations from Catholic social teaching, corporatism and syndicalism. The party thus sought to compete for nationalist and anti-war votes with the Union Nationale, but at the same time largely keeping the economic policies of the Liberals.

Duplessis largely succeeded in sidelining the Bloc populaire, however, by portraying the religious minorities, the federal government and the trade unions as threatening the province's interests, autonomy, traditions and identity. In the same vein, Duplessis attacked Godbout's reforms as threatening the Church, the clergy and the religion (and indeed many Godbout's initiatives were criticized by Cardinal Villeneuve). During the campaign, Duplessis notably floated a false anti-Semitic conspiracy theory that asserted that the federal government and the Quebec Liberals struck a secret deal with the so-called "International Zionist Brotherhood" to settle 100,000 Holocaust refugees in Quebec in exchange for campaign contributions for federal and provincial Liberals, and pledged to prevent it from happening. While Max Beer argues that this story did not influence the election result very much, the public and the press was enthusiastic about a leader who would not let any refugees arrive in la belle province. The business community, in its turn, was assured by his will to pursue development driven by private investments and opposition to state takeovers of companies.

In the 1944 election, Duplessis's Union Nationale received the smallest share of votes in any election during his leadership (just over 38%) and finished behind the Liberals in the popular vote count, but due to vote splitting between the Bloc populaire and Godbout's party, it was the Union Nationale that got the majority in the Legislative Assembly, with 48 out of 91 MLAs belonging to Duplessis's party.

Second premiership 
Even though the majority of the Union Nationale seemed tenuous to his Liberal opponents, it eventually led to 15 years of uninterrupted rule over the province. This was common in post-war Canada as the incumbent governments were able to take credit for the strong economic performance and were often reelected on this basis. Several other factors specific to Quebec also helped in the longevity of his rule: the first was his personal charisma, which was so strong that the figure of Duplessis mattered much more than the party he represented; another reason was his media-savvy team of talented campaign managers led by Joseph Damase-Bégin, his minister of colonization. The fact that the party secured a steady source of income from kickbacks from business entities helped implement the lavish campaign styles that the managers proposed. Threats to withdraw funds if the riding did not support the Union Nationale's candidate, malapportionment in favour of rural areas, which were the party's stronghold, and support from the high clergy further cemented the long reign of Duplessis.

The reign itself could be descrribed as having authoritarian tendencies. Even though the Legislative Assembly deliberated with all the usual organs, Duplessis was the de facto rulemaker in parliament. Le Chef enforced party discipline very strictly and, with very few exceptions, decision autonomy in the cabinet or in the Legislative Assembly was nonexistent. Duplessis, in his capacity as Attorney General, would enforce censorship, whether by statutory authorization or simply at his will. Media outlets suspected of sympathizing with the Communists would be closed down and the property confiscated by virtue of the Padlock Act. Cinema productions would also be censored for moral considerations. As for newspapers, they would be ordered not to report on the Union Nationale's wrongdoings for fear of retribution from Duplessis. Le Chef also engaged in a fight against Jehovah's Witnesses, who were not popular in Quebec and whom he equated to communists and the Nazis, though he ultimately lost court cases connected to them in the Supreme Court of Canada.

Duplessis's rule was socially conservative. The regime generally enjoyed strong support from the high echelons of the Catholic Church, though lower-tier priests did not necessarily endorse him. The Church played an outsized influence in the lives of Quebeckers since most services in healthcare and education were provided by it, which only started to change after 1960. An important issue for him was the preservation of French Canadian values: the Catholic faith, the French language and the local traditions, which appealed to the masses by the populism of the rhetoric. In order to preserve it, he argued, Quebec had to defend its provincial autonomy from the encroachment of the federal government. It was usually done by means of refusing to participate in federal-provincial programs, which at that time mostly consisted of new welfare policies, but also through asserting its power to taxation, which Duplessis successfully did in 1955.

The post-war economic expansion defined the economic development of Quebec under Duplessis. Full employment stayed in the province for over a decade and average wages were rising slightly faster than in the rest of Canada. GDP growth was fairly strong and was in a large degree as a result of a large stream of investment and general improvements in efficiency. The way Duplessis solicited the investments was consistent with economic liberalism. Quebec refused state intervention in resource extraction itself and thus relied heavily on out-of-province (English Canadian or American) capital to develop its rich natural resources, which it attracted using the combination of low taxes, low regulation and pro-employer labour policies. Trade unions in particular were a target of Duplessis's interventions. Duplessis had a consistent position of disincentivizing collective bargaining by passing unfavourable laws for organized labour, which at the time was unique in Canada. When strike action did occur, the police was immediately deployed to break it (as was the case in Asbestos in 1949).

Quebec's management of the budget was fiscally conservative. The budget was balanced and the debt was decreasing. While the size of the budget increased substantially, Duplessis derided most attempts at welfare state in Quebec as "Anglo-Saxon and Protestant socialism", and called for charity to fill in the gaps, though ironically, by the end of his rule it was the federal government which footed most of the welfare bill in Quebec. The main investments of the era was the construction of hospitals and schools across the province, the increase of electricity supply via Hydro-Québec and development in rural areas (particularly through the Rural Electrification Office), Despite these investments, rural areas remained much poorer and less developed than urban areas, which is why the Duplessis's era saw an exodus of rural population towards Montreal. Additionally, the situation of majority French Canadians still remained worse than that of the Anglophone minority, as the latter dominated the business world of Montreal, the financial centre of Canada at the time, took most of the top jobs available, and had substantial autonomy within the province.

Death, funeral and the end of the dominance of the Union Nationale 
Duplessis suffered from numerous health problems throughout his life. He underwent two surgeries for a strangulated hernia in 1930 and 1942, which each time ended in several-month-long stays in the hospital due to complications or other diseases slowing down his recovery, as well as a shorter one for injuries he had sustained in a car accident in 1929. Duplessis had also been a heavy drinker, but on the advice of his doctor, his party's pressure and Adélard Godbout's suggestion that this "weakness was going to ruin [Duplessis]", became abstinent after his second surgery. Also in 1942, doctors diagnosed Duplessis with diabetes, which particularly caused trouble in the last years of his life. By the end of 1958, in the middle of his fourth term, Le Chef's health started to deteriorate significantly and he struggled to keep on with the prior habits of his premiership. Doctors warned him that he was overstretching himself and needed some rest, but he went on with his duties.
Sometime before 2 September 1959, Duplessis accepted the invitation of Quebec Iron, a subsidiary of the Iron Ore Company of Canada, to travel to Schefferville to see its mines. The flight to Sept-Îles and then the mining town was uneventful, but at about lunch time on 3 September, while staying in the company's guesthouse, Duplessis suffered a hemorragic (bleeding) stroke, which paralyzed his right leg and arm and sent him into a barely conscious state; three more strokes occurred by 4 September. After balancing on the verge of life for two more days, Duplessis died on 7 September at 0:01 am EDT (UTC-4).

The body was placed in a coffin covered by the flag of Quebec, which he introduced back in 1948, and was transported to the airport of Ancienne-Lorette (today's Jean Lesage Airport in Quebec City), where it arrived at 6:10 am the same day. Duplessis's body was then embalmed and laid in state in the building of the Legislative Assembly. About 100,000 people arrived to pay homage for the late premier until 10 September, when the body was transported to his hometown of Trois-Rivières. The funeral service in the Assumption Cathedral of that city, officiated by Cardinal Paul-Émile Léger, Archbishop of Montreal, and Archbishop Maurice Roy of Quebec, was attended by eleven members of the federal cabinet, including Prime Minister John Diefenbaker, all of the provincial cabinet and the Lieutenant Governor of Quebec, three fellow premiers and nine bishops and archbishops, among other high officials. Another 50,000 people paid respects to Duplessis in his hometown, after which he was buried alongside his parents.

On the evening of 10 September 1959, the caucus of the Union Nationale proposed to the Lieutenant Governor that Paul Sauvé be sworn in as premier, which he was on the morning of the following day. The time of his rule is widely known as that of "désormais" (from now on) and seen as a break from his predecessor. That said, despite the several reforms that have been implemented in the short "100 days", as the period is called, Sauvé stressed his loyalty to the legacy of Duplessis and portrayed his rule as the continuation of what Duplessis was doing; the same was with Antonio Barrette, who succeeded Sauvé after the latter's death in January 1960. The frequent changes of power threw the Union Nationale into disarray just before the planned election in June, which Jean Lesage's Liberals won. This defeat of the Union Nationale started the Quiet Revolution.

Private life 
Duplessis was a lifelong bachelor and had no children. In fact, Le Chef would tell people that he had no family and that his only responsibility was the welfare of his province, to which he said he belonged. For most of his political life, Duplessis lived alone in Château Frontenac. Conrad Black suggests, however, that during World War I Duplessis courted Augustine Delisle, a daughter of a prosperous coal trader, but his family disapproved of a connection that would unite them with a family of merchants. Duplessis remained bitter towards his relatives over their opposition to this marriage, and seems to have decided at this time never to marry. Duplessis still remained close to his sisters as well as their husbands. He also became a godfather of a daughter of Antonio Talbot, the minister of roads in his post-war government.

In his later life, his relation with other women was quite idiosyncratic: he believed that he had to behave in a strictly aristocratic and gentelmanly manner towards them even if in real life his comments to them would often come across as risqué. In general, by the end of his life, Duplessis would more and more feel as if he were part of aristocracy and behave and dress accordingly, even though he had no blood relation to it. Conrad Black suggests that hypospadias could also have affected somewhat his relationships with women.

Despite a populist image Duplessis created in public and rumours that persisted even after his death, his hobbies included opera and literature. Even though he most liked to read historical or political books, he also read classical French or English-language authors, such as Rudyard Kipling, Tennyson and Shakespeare. Later in his life, Duplessis developed a taste for paintings and started collecting them. At his death, his sister Jeanne-L. Balcer-Duplessis inherited the works of art, which she donated to the provincial government in exchange for the cancellation of the inheritance tax. Most of the paintings, including those by Clarence Gagnon, Cornelius Krieghoff, J. M. W. Turner, Auguste Renoir, Charles Jacque, Cornelis Springer and Johan Jongkind, may be seen in the National Museum of Fine Arts of Quebec. On the other hand, his love of sport was not unequivocal. In fact, Duplessis has not practised any in his life, except for croquet. However, he supported the Montreal Canadiens and tuned into radio broadcasts of international baseball matches with the New York Yankees. In addition to that, he ran a local cricket club in his hometown of Trois-Rivières.

Historical debate 
Duplessis is recognized as one of the most colourful, if controversial, figures of Canadian politics. Even more than 60 years after his death, his figure still polarizes the political landscape of Quebec. Few people dare to emphasize the continuity of their policies with those of Duplessis for fear of being ridiculed, as the rule of Duplessis generally has negative connotations in the Quebec society. The opinions are so strong about him that being compared to Duplessis is considered an insult. This was already the case shortly after the Union Nationale's downfall in 1960: in the 1960s, it was suggested that Quebec make a total break from the past and embrace a new path of development via a "revolution". By the time a new generation of adults emerged in the 1980s, which did not have appreciable contact with either Duplessis or the events of the 1960s, it was already associating Duplessis with negative phenomena much more than the positive ones.

Duplessis as the incarnation of the Grande Noirceur 

The intellectual circles were not kind to Duplessis even throughout his life. Pierre Trudeau would write in Cité libre that Duplessis did not tax enough on the provincial level and this enabled the federal government's invasion of the provincial autonomy and deprived Quebeckers of the needed social services. In Le Devoir, André Laurendeau penned an editorial,  (The Theory of the Negro King), which proposed the following theory: the foreign capital allowed Duplessis to stay in power so that he could officially allow to ruthlessly exploit the province of Quebec, and the role of Duplessis was along the lines of the "Negro Kings", the local chieftains whom the British allowed some control over their area but who had to recognize the supremacy of their overlords.

The attacks intensified following the death of Le Chef. Shortly before the 1960 elections, Pierre Laporte published the first biography after Duplessis's death, which portrayed him as an intelligent but ruthless politician who would stay in power through corruption and repression of political opponents. Leslie Roberts' book outright called Duplessis a "Latin-American dictator" who would cater to the simplistic desires of French Canadians but which failed to lift them from the state of inferiority with respect to the Anglophones. The Quiet Revolution was supposed to be a remedy to the darkness embodied by Duplessis, and the discourse became so prevalent that to this day, Duplessis is associated with the label Grande Noirceur (Great Darkness).

The interpretations behind the label (and even the dates of the beginning of this "shameful" period) vary but generally revolve around the criticism of defending a regressive model of society, blocking progress and leaving patronage and corruption entrenched. Jacques Godbout, in defending the label, described the period of Duplessis as that of "perverse control of sexuality, contempt for the industry, art, economy and rejection of the scientific thought" and said that in intellectual circles, the Grande Noirceur was also a period of grande silence (great silence) and grande peur (great fear). Among other supporters of this interpretation were trade unionist Madeleine Parent, who was imprisoned for "seditious conspiracy" in 1955, Gérard Pelletier, who in these times also was a union organizer, who described Duplessis's views as those of a "19th-century rural notary", and Jacques Hébert. Yves Vaillancourt, who analyzed the period in detail from the point of the delivery of social services, stated that social justice was in disrepute. The view that the era is that of the Grande Noirceur is also present in some English-language scholarly books that briefly describe that era.

Challenging the Grande Noirceur label 
In the 1970s, despite an overwhelmingly negative coverage of Le Chef, two biographies cast him in a very positive light. , who defended Duplessis's policies throughout his life, including by writing propaganda pieces on the Union Nationale's behalf, penned a biography of Duplessis published in 1973. Conrad Black's biography, published in 1977, just like Rumilly's, received substantial criticism from the historians of the time. However, with time, the 1977 biography became more and more accepted, and in 2021, the books are either considered reliable even if they are biased and have some methodological issues, or, alternatively, flawed but usable, particularly given that no historian wrote a similar biography after them. In short, Rumilly praised his devotion to the Catholic Church and defended his fight against "subversive" organizations, such as trade unions; Black, on the other hand, believed that Duplessis was an able politician who managed to modernize the province even while defending traditional values; the latter then further clarified that in his view, the Québécois owe their prosperity to Duplessis as he was using the money saved from underpaying teachers and nurses to make infrastructural investments. These views, however, did not sway the public opinion much.

The next wave of change came with the researchers of the 1980s and the 1990s, who were much more distanced from the then dominant idea of Duplessism as something awful and to be avoided, which was how historians who personally witnessed the Quiet Revolution viewed it. The movement did not want to revise the history as in rewriting the facts about that period but rather changing the perspectives on it, giving different interpretations and assigning different weights to the events. This started with the publication of the synthesis of the history of Quebec by Linteau et al., which was published in 1979 and 1986 in French (or as Quebec since 1930 in English) and which emphasized that Quebec, in fact, was developing in line with the rest of North America and the West in general; issues specific to Quebec, like the Catholic Church, were not as important as previously assumed or reported. In 1994, Bourque et al. published another book that argued that, contrary to common belief, the Duplessis government was actually liberal in its outlook as it embraced economic progress and modern capitalism and did not oppose liberal democracy, all while pushing back against the welfare state and staying within traditional values of Quebec. This interpretation was challenged by numerous historians, who variously argued that the regime was conservative and/or illiberal in its nature. Among those who changed their opinion of the regime in the course of the years was Léon Dion, who wrote in 1993 that the assessment of the period as Grande Noirceur (as he and like-minded scholars proposed in the 1960s) was unreasonably harsh and his policies on economy, such as the development of Northern Quebec, were reasonable or at least justifiable. He also argued that the blame for the regime's regressiveness should be also laid on the Catholic Church and on the society, which wanted order and security and thus tolerated the oppression. Dion, just like some other historians, also tends to agree on the validity of Duplessis's defence of the provincial autonomy.

In today's historiography of Quebec (at least since the 1990s), most scholars express the opinion that the myth of the Grande Noirceur was constructed by those who embraced or spearheaded the Quiet Revolution in the 1960s. Alexandre Dumas writes that the notion of the Quiet Revolution cannot live without the "anti-hero" Duplessis and the association with the Great Darkness. Michel Sarra-Bournet and Gérard Bouchard suggested that the portrayal of Duplessis's era as that of the Great Darkness that only concerned Quebec may not be justified as the contemporary governments of Ontario, Manitoba and New Zealand shared many characteristics that contribute to the notion of the Grande Noirceur, such as resistance to the welfare state, anti-communism, corruption scandals and the rural focus on investments. A similar opinion was expressed by Jocelyn Létourneau. Yet other historians emphasize in their opinions that the "rupture" between the Quiet Revolution and Duplessis is not present in every aspect of Quebec's life, generally exaggerated or even artificially created, or else that it should be better thought of as a transitionary period. Some authors go as far as rejecting the label altogether as a "gross caricature", framing this period as that of the "Great Catch-Up", in comparison to the "Quiet Decline" that followed the death of Le Chef, or even, as in the case with Éric Bedard, dissolving the period of the reign of Duplessis and that of the Quiet Revolution into the "Quiet Reconquest".

Attempts at comparison 
The ideology of Duplessis and the Union Nationale between 1936 and 1959 was subject to numerous studies, and several comparisons have been proposed. A 1984 paper by George Steven Swan compared the policies of Duplessis and those of Huey Long, a left-populist American politician from Louisiana, and of Juan Perón of Argentina, and found many similarities between all three, in particular as they related to authoritarian practices. Léon Dion, in some similarity to Leslie Roberts, argued that his rule could be compared to that of Latin American dictators, though occasional comparisons to fascism, in his opinion, were wrong. Frédéric Boily disagreed as he thought that this comparison, if interpreted in the sense that Duplessis's regimes were populust, just like those of Perón and Brazil's Getúlio Vargas, is somewhat simplistic, as he argues that Duplessis was not fully populist but made good use of populist rhetoric. Jean-Philippe Warren wrote that his style of governance could be compared to a type of regime called "authoritarian democracy", though Gilles Bourque dismissed it as inaccurate as, in his view, the rule of Duplessis bears little similarity to the regime of Vladimir Putin in Russia, which also counts as "authoritarian democracy" under Warren's definition. Catherine Frost, in comparing the nationalism in Ireland and that of Quebec, saw many similarities between Duplessis and Éamon de Valera. With respect to Duplessis's staunch anti-Communism, his policies were likened to those of U.S. Senator Joseph McCarthy.

In the context of Quebec, some historians compared Mario Dumont, with his Action démocratique du Québec, to Duplessis's, in respect to Dumont's similarities with the program of the Union Nationale, its emphasis on provincial autonomy and the (rather successful) usage of populist rhetoric at times when the electorate was tired of the prior state of politics. Dumont himself said he was "flattered" by the comparison, though he said he even more preferred references to Jean Lesage. More recently, the current premier of Quebec, François Legault, was compared to Le Chef, and his Coalition Avenir Québec to the Union Nationale. Legault, in fact, used one of the opportunities to defend Le Chef's legacy during a heated parliamentary debate in 2021. In this incident, the co-leader of the left-wing Québec solidaire party, Gabriel Nadeau-Dubois, compared the leader of the CAQ to Duplessis while accusing Legault of excluding those Quebeckers who opposed Bill 21 from the definition of who is Québécois and of claiming to be "the father of the Quebec nation". The premier, however, retorted that while, in his opinion, Duplessis had many faults, he defended Quebec, unlike the "woke" Nadeau-Dubois.

Commemoration

In culture and collective memory of Quebeckers 
Immediately after the death of Duplessis, provincial politicians took pains to preserve the memory of Le Chef. A provincial riding was created in 1960 from parts of Saguenay (now René-Lévesque) electoral district. The following year, Boulevard Champigny, a major thoroughfare in Quebec City, was renamed after Duplessis, and is now alternatively known as Autoroute 540.  in the northeastern part of the Island of Montreal was named that way in 1967. The government was also interested in building a monument, but it did not go according to plan. In November 1959, just after Duplessis's death, Paul Sauvé introduced a law in the Legislative Assembly, which it passed in a few days, that envisaged building a monument to Maurice Duplessis and placing it somewhere in the vicinity of the Parliament Building. This was unusual at the time as before 1980, it was the government (via the Ministry of Public Works), not the parliament, which decided on the decorations, and also since Honoré Mercier was the only provincial politician with a statue in front of the Legislative Assembly. By summer 1961, Joseph-Émile Brunet, who had already scuplted a bust of Duplessis, made the monument ready, but the government of Jean Lesage ordered to hide it. Therefore, the first statue of Le Chef was unveiled in Trois-Rivières by the Société des amis de Maurice L. Duplessis, a private organization dedicated to the preservation of Duplessis's heritage, which was then commemorating the fifth anniversary of Le Chef's death.

The government commemoration of Duplessis seemed to have lost steam as the Quiet Revolution progressed and the general populace had a negative view of the Duplessis's reign. By the time Jean-Jacques Bertrand, also of the Union Nationale, became premier in 1968, even the party's supporters relegated Duplessis to the subconscious. Le Chef came again under the spotlight in the 1970s, with numerous books about his rule for academic and general public circulation alike (including the two biographies by Rumilly and Black). A very successful play called  by John Thomas McDonough, describing the Asbestos strike, appared in Quebec City's theatres in 1971. Denys Arcand treated him extensively in his early film career: in 1972, he directed Québec: Duplessis et après for the National Film Board of Canada, and, six years later, he was a screenwriter for the TV series Duplessis, which was released on the screens of Radio-Canada - both proved quite sympathetic to Le Chef and minimized the supposed rupture between Duplessis and what was after that. In 1974, Parks Canada designated Duplessis as a Person of National Historic Significance. Three years later, and 18 years after the Legislative Assembly decreed so, René Lévesque retrieved Brunet's monument from the storage and unveiled it next to the Parliament Building. The statue, which was initially hidden because of concerns it would provoke "civil disorder", was unveiled as the sovereigntist Parti Québécois was courting Union Nationale supporters. The preparation copies of the monument are stored in the Museum of Fine Arts of Quebec.

In the 1980s, the negative coverage of Duplessis in the arts still continued. Among these works was a collection of feminist articles by Andrée Yanacopoulo, Au nom du père, du fils et de Duplessis, and a TV series Asbestos. Michel Tremblay's Le gars de Québec (1985), set in 1952, draws inspiration from Gogol's The Government Inspector and has rather critical references to the era. In the words of Pierre Berthelot, a simple mention of his name was enough to create his invisible but oppressive presence that made characters stuck in their hardships and which treated them to abuses by government agents. Quebec did not become interested in Duplessis's heritage in the 1980s despite the favourable climate for conservative politicians. The Union Nationale, then under the stewardship of Roch La Salle, distanced itself from the heritage of Maurice Duplessis and lost all seats in the 1981 election, after which the party maintained a nominal presence in provincial politics before being finally disbanded in 1989. The 1990s proved even worse for his memory as a documentary in 1997, Les Orphelins de Duplessis, made the abuses committed against the Duplessis Orphans known to a wide public and further entrenched the image of Duplessis's era as that of the Great Darkness. In the 21st century, with the exception of some non-scholarly works like that of Martin Lemay, a former Parti Québécois member of the National Assembly, the negative image of the era persisted. For example, during the student protests of 2012, often known as "Maple Spring", Gabriel Nadeau-Dubois, then one of the leaders of the protests, suggested that the government's Bill 78, which aimed to suppress protests, was a return to the times of Duplessis; participants in the demonstrations also painted a graffiti saying, in rough translation: "Come back Duplessis, you've left your pigs!", in protest against the use of riot police. A microbrewery called Dieu du Ciel! of Saint-Jérôme produces a variety of dark beer called Grande Noirceur with suggestive imagery - a caricature appearance of Le Chef manipulating the assembled population with strings (as if they were puppets), with church towers behind him.

Honorary titles 

Le Chef held some top positions in relation to his law career. On 30 December 1931, Duplessis received the title of King's counsel due to his achievements in the field of law. In addition to that, he was elected President of the Bar of Quebec and President of the Bar of Trois-Rivières for the 1937–1938 term, which, in addition to conferring prestige to the Premier, gave him some influence over the internal order of the bar. Several universities granted him honorary degrees, including Université Laval (three times: apart from a law degree in 1937 and forestry sciences in 1955, a general honorary doctorate was granted in 1952), McGill University (law, 1948), Université de Montréal (law, 1953), Université de Sherbrooke (law, 1956), as well as from Bishop's University and the University of Caen in France.

Maurice Duplessis also received several decorations. In 1948, Argentine President Juan Perón gave Duplessis the highest decoration, the Grand Cross of the Order of the Liberator General San Martín, which provoked a minor diplomatic incident as the government of Canada had advised foreign emissaries not to give any such distinctions to its citizens. Other awards that Le Chef received include a golden star of the Ordre national du mérite agricole (1946), a provincial order for people who contributed to the development of agriculture, and the induction in the Commonwealth's Order of Saint John.

Notes

References

Books

In English

In French 

 (vol. 1: 1890–1944, vol. 2: 1944–1959)

Audiovisual materials 

 
  – the visit of the Royal Family connected with the opening of the Saint Lawrence Seaway
 
Duplessis, a seven-episode series by Denys Arcand (1978)
 Two series from the documentary  (1997), in French:
 Finally, the war (1929-1945)
 The times of Duplessis (1945-1959)
 (1997), a documentary about the origins of Hydro-Québec from Radio-Canada, with first two series covering Duplessis's era, in French
 (1997), a two-part documentary about the Duplessis Orphans, Radio-Canada, in French
Three episodes from the documentary  [30 days that have shaped Quebec], 2000, in French:
 Maurice Duplessis gets to power – 17 August 1936
 Maurice Duplessis's revenge – 8 August 1944
 The beginning of the Asbestos strike – 13 February 1949
 The Premiers, a documentary on provincial leaders, with an episode on Duplessis: part 1, 2, 3

Short biographical and bibliographical entries

External links
Duplessis's Speeches from the Throne

*The Union Nationale was founded as an alliance in 1935 with Duplessis as leader. In 1936 the UN formally became a unitary political party with the Quebec Conservative Party dissolving into it.

Maurice Duplessis
1890 births
1959 deaths
Premiers of Quebec
Université de Montréal alumni
Lawyers in Quebec
People from Trois-Rivières
Canadian Roman Catholics
Persons of National Historic Significance (Canada)
Conservative Party of Quebec MNAs
Canadian political party founders
Union Nationale (Quebec) MNAs
Leaders of the Union Nationale (Quebec)
Conservatism in Canada
Right-wing politics in Canada
Canadian people of World War II
Anti-anarchism
Anti-communism
Populism in Canada
Right-wing populism in Canada
Canadian anti-communists
Antisemitism in Canada
Recipients of the Order of the Liberator General San Martin
Far-right politics in Canada